Hermann Dold (born 5 October 1882 in Stuttgart, died 31 October 1962 in Freiburg im Breisgau) was a German physician and bacteriologist.

Biography

He studied medicine at the University of Tübingen and the University of Berlin, and earned his doctorate in medicine in 1906. From 1908, he served as Demonstrator of Bacteriology and Comparative Pathology at the Royal Institute of Public Health in London, before he was employed by the Imperial Health Office in Berlin in 1910. He earned his Habilitation at the University of Strasbourg in 1912, and served as an Adjunct Professor there, before he became Professor of Medicine at the German Medical College for the Chinese in Shanghai. He undertook several research expeditions in China, Japan and Russia.

In 1919, he returned to Germany, and worked for a number of scientific institutions, before he was appointed Associate Professor at the University of Marburg in 1926. He became professor at the University of Kiel in 1928, at the University of Tübingen in 1934, and finally served as Professor at the University of Freiburg from 1936 until his retirement in 1952. He also served as Dean of the Faculty of Medicine.

Dold published works on tropical medicine, tuberculosis, syphilis and on antibacterial inhibitory substances and conversion. He was one of the editors of the influential journal Medical Microbiology and Immunology. He was a member of the Academy of Sciences Leopoldina.

Selected publications 
 Über die Wirkung des Äthylalkohols und verwandter Alkohole auf das isolierte Froschherz, Tübingen 1906
 Bakterienanaphylatoxin und seine Bedeutung für die Infektion, 1913
 Tuberkulose und Alkoholismus, Neutr. Guttempler-Verl., Heidelberg 1913
 Hygienisches Praktikum: Ein Taschenbuch f. Studierende, Arzte u. Kreisarztkandidaten, Urban & Schwarzenberg, Berlin/Vienna 1914 (with Paul Uhlenhuth), Allgäuer Druckerei u. Verl.-Anst., Kempten (Allg.) 1953
 Wie steht es um den deutschen Volkskörper?, Lipsius & Tischer, Kiel 1931
 Untersuchungen von Milch und Milchprodukten der Breisgau-Milchzentrale Freiburg auf Tuberkel-Bakterien mit negativem Ergebnis : Ein Beitr. zur Frage d. Zuverlässigkeit e. sorgfältigen Pasteurisierung (Kurzzeit-Verfahren), Allgäuer Druckerei u. Verl.-Anst., Kempten (Allg.) 1953 (with Gerhard Jordan)

External links

References 

German bacteriologists
Academic staff of the University of Freiburg
Academic staff of the University of Marburg
Academic staff of the University of Kiel
Academic staff of the University of Tübingen
Academic staff of the University of Strasbourg
Physicians from Stuttgart
20th-century German physicians
1882 births
1962 deaths
Medical Microbiology and Immunology editors